Nauru was represented at the 2006 Commonwealth Games in Melbourne by a team consisting purely of weight-lifters.

Medals

Medalists

Sport in Nauru
Nauru at the Commonwealth Games
Nations at the 2006 Commonwealth Games
Commonwealth Games